Annay is the name or part of the name of several communes in France:

 Annay, Nièvre, in the Nièvre department
 Annay, Pas-de-Calais, in the Pas-de-Calais department
 Annay-la-Côte, in the Yonne department
 Annay-sur-Serein, in the Yonne department